Tartu Synagogue was a synagogue in Tartu, Estonia.

The synagogue was built in 1903 and was designed by a local architect R. Pohlmann.

The synagogue was destroyed during WW II. Many of the synagogue's items were saved and these can be seen in Estonian National Museum.

See also
Tallinn Synagogue
History of the Jews in Estonia

References

Buildings and structures in Tartu
Synagogues in Estonia
Synagogues completed in 1903
Orthodox synagogues